The Australia women's national cricket team toured New Zealand in the last week of February 2017. The tour took place immediately after the completion of the Australia-New Zealand WT20I series in Australia. The two teams competed in a series of three Women's One Day International cricket (WODIs) for the Rose Bowl. Australia women won the series 2–1.

Squads

Ahead of the tour, Sophie Devine was ruled out of New Zealand's squad due to injury and was replaced by Samantha Curtis. Leigh Kasperek was ruled out of the series after an injury in the first Women's Twenty20 International match against Australia in Australia earlier in the month. She was replaced by Amelia Kerr. Maddy Green was also ruled out of the New Zealand squad due to injury. Meanwhile, Rachael Haynes was added to Australia's squad as cover for Alex Blackwell, who has a minor hamstring strain, but is not expected to miss the series.

WODI series

1st WODI

2nd WODI

3rd WODI

References

External links
 Series home at ESPN Cricinfo

International cricket competitions in 2016–17
2017 in women's cricket
2016–17 Australian women's cricket season
2017 in New Zealand cricket
New Zealand 2017
Australia 2017
cricket
February 2017 sports events in New Zealand
March 2017 sports events in New Zealand